Nadezhda Vasilyevna Yakubovich (born 24 February 1954 in Narutovichi, Brest) is a retired female javelin thrower who represented the Soviet Union during her career. She is best known for twice winning the gold medal in the women's javelin throw event at the Summer Universiade.

Achievements

References
sports-reference

1954 births
Living people
Belarusian female javelin throwers
Soviet female javelin throwers
Athletes (track and field) at the 1976 Summer Olympics
Olympic athletes of the Soviet Union
Universiade medalists in athletics (track and field)
Universiade gold medalists for the Soviet Union
Medalists at the 1975 Summer Universiade
Medalists at the 1977 Summer Universiade